Jorge Eugenio Rodríguez Álvarez (born 11 August 1980) is a Spanish former footballer who played as a central defender.

Club career
Born in Cee, Galicia, Rodríguez finished his development at RC Celta de Vigo's youth academy, and started his senior career with their reserves in the 1999–2000 season. On 18 January 2003, he made his first-team – and La Liga – debut, starting in a 1–0 away loss against Real Sociedad.

In summer 2005, Rodríguez signed with Racing de Ferrol of Segunda División. He joined Segunda División B club Mérida UD six months later, and competed at the same level the following eight years, representing CD Ourense, Zamora CF, Pontevedra CF, Real Oviedo, Real Avilés CF and SD Compostela.

References

External links

Celta de Vigo biography 

1980 births
Living people
Spanish footballers
Footballers from Galicia (Spain)
Association football defenders
La Liga players
Segunda División players
Segunda División B players
Tercera División players
Divisiones Regionales de Fútbol players
Celta de Vigo B players
RC Celta de Vigo players
Racing de Ferrol footballers
Mérida UD footballers
CD Ourense footballers
Zamora CF footballers
Pontevedra CF footballers
Real Oviedo players
Real Avilés CF footballers
SD Compostela footballers